The Chiemsee Cauldron is a gold cauldron found at the bottom of Lake Chiemsee in Bavaria in 2001. The cauldron is decorated with figures reminiscent of the style of the Gundestrup cauldron.

History
The Chiemsee Cauldron was discovered in 2001 by a local diver at the bottom of Lake Chiemsee, about 200m from the shore near Arlaching, Chieming municipality. It was initially suspected to be some 2,000 years old, judging by its Celtic-style decoration and its similarity to the Gundestrup cauldron. However, when the artifact was passed along to Ludwig Wamser of the Bavarian State Archaeological Collection to be analyzed, it was identified as a 20th-century creation, possibly made during the Nazi era. This seemed to be confirmed by a witness; the senior director of the Munich jeweller's company Theodor Heiden stated that the company's goldsmith, Alfred Notz, before his death in the 1960s, had told him about a "golden cauldron weighing more than 10 kg, with a figurative ornament and manufactured by means of the paddle and anvil technique," which had been manufactured in Heiden's workshop between 1925 and 1939.

The maker of the cauldron is believed to have been Otto Gahr, a Nazi Party member, silversmith and favoured jeweller to the Nazi elite. Gahr crafted the silver "death's head" rings worn by SS members. In an interview with National Geographic, jeweler Maximillian Heiden opined that Gahr would have been the obvious choice of the Nazi Party for such a project. According to Max Heiden, Otto Gahr, primarily a silversmith, probably sought out Alfred Notz for his expertise in working with gold. Furthermore, Nazi documents dated April 1945 were found in an attic in Germany in 2011. The papers, which appear to be a movement order for 35 items ranging from gold and silver to precious stones, were discovered among items once belonging to Heinrich Himmler. The documents list a "gold cauldron/Celtic" along with the name "Otto Gahr" and "Munich".

The cauldron was commissioned by Albert Pietzsch, director of  Elektrochemische Werke München. Pietzsch had been in personal contact with Hitler from 1920, and was known to have provided him with generous donations. He became a member of the Nazi party in 1927 and rose to the position of Military Economy Leader (Wehrwirtschaftsführer) and president of the Reich Chamber of Commerce (Reichswirtschaftskammer). He survived the war and died in 1957. Because of its association with the Nazi elite, the cauldron was dubbed "Hitler's bedpan" (Hitlers Nachttopf) by the media.

The Bavarian state and the finder agreed to sell the find on the open market and share the proceeds. The cauldron was bought by an investor for EUR 300,000, at the time about twice the market value of the gold. The buyer, a Swiss entrepreneur, tried to attract investors by claiming that the cauldron was a genuine antique, and that it had a market value of between €250 and €350 million. Investors from Kazakhstan, taken in by these claims, filed suit against the Swiss businessman in 2006. The cauldron was confiscated by the Zürich authorities in 2007, and a fraud trial began on 27 October 2010. As the trial opened, the defendant claimed to have found a new buyer for the cauldron who was prepared to pay 7 million Swiss francs, which would allow him to satisfy all claims against his firm.

References

External links
 Spiegel Online - "Schatzfund: Nazi-Goldkessel im Chiemsee" (with photograph)
 YouTube Smithsonian Channel - "A Gold Cauldron's Sinister Secrets" (extract from 2012 National Geographic documentary)
Containers
Gold objects
Archaeological forgeries